Mohammed Naji (Arabic:محمد ناجي محمد) (born 7 March 1965) is an Iraqi politician, Deputy in the Iraqi parliament, the head of the "Badr parliamentary organization" and Leading member of Badr Organization.

Positions 
 Deputy in the Iraqi parliament.
 He was also elected Executive Secretary of the United Iraqi Coalition in the second parliamentary session
 He is currently the Executive Secretary of the Badr Political Bureau
 Member of the Parliamentary Security and Defense Committee

References

1965 births
Living people
Badr Brigade members
Members of the Council of Representatives of Iraq
People from Baghdad
Iraqi Shia Muslims